Mouaad Madri (born 9 April 1990) is a French professional footballer who plays as a striker.

He has played for Dunkerque, Ajaccio, and Lens.

Career
In June 2017, Madri joined RC Lens.

Personal life
Born in France, Madri is of Moroccan descent.

References

External links

1990 births
Living people
People from Saint-Pol-sur-Mer
Sportspeople from Nord (French department)
French footballers
French sportspeople of Moroccan descent
Association football forwards
Ligue 2 players
Championnat National players
Championnat National 2 players
Championnat National 3 players
USL Dunkerque players
AC Ajaccio players
RC Lens players
Footballers from Hauts-de-France